Dianthus alpinus, the alpine pink, is a species of flowering plant in the family Caryophyllaceae, endemic to the Alps of Eastern Austria. It is a short (2–10 cm high) mat-forming herbaceous perennial, with linear to lanceolate leaves, 15–25 mm long and 2–5 mm wide. The flowers are a deep cerise pink with white spots, appearing from June to August.

A calcicole, the species is found in the north-eastern limestone Alps of Austria from the Totes Gebirge in the west to Semmering and the Schneeberg in the east.

In cultivation in the UK. it has gained the Royal Horticultural Society's Award of Garden Merit. It requires a well-drained position in full sun, such as a rock garden. It may be short-lived in cultivation.

References

Bibliography

External links
 Alpine Pink in Alpine Garden Society Encyclopaedia of Alpine Plants.
 Flora Austria

alpinus
Endemic flora of Austria
Flora of the Alps
~
Plants described in 1753
Taxa named by Carl Linnaeus